was a Japanese trio group consisting of three main seiyus from the anime Wedding Peach namely Kyōko Hikami,  Yūko Miyamura, Yukana and later Yuka Imai.

Members

1995
 Kyōko Hikami
 Yūko Miyamura
 Yukana

1996
 Yuka Imai

Discography

Singles

References

Anime musicians
Anime singers
Japanese pop music groups
Japanese girl groups
Japanese voice actresses
King Records (Japan) artists
Musical groups established in 1995
Musical groups disestablished in 1997